Domaine  Leroy is a vineyard estate which produces red Burgundy. The domaine has always produced biodynamic wine, and is certified by ECOCERT. Lalou Bize-Leroy of Domaine Leroy also owns a quarter of Domaine de la Romanée-Conti.
The domaine has 23 hectares of vines, mostly Premier Cru and Grand Cru classified.

References 

Wineries of France
Burgundy wine